Recollections of a California Pioneer is a memoir by Carlisle S. Abbott. It was published by The Neale Publishing Company in 1917.

The book details Abbott's life and journey along the Oregon Trail to California, along with some discussion of his life in California and the early politics of Salinas Valley. 

Born in Canada in 1828, Abbott ran away from home as a teenage, traveled across the Great Plains twice, worked as a miner, and lived alongside the Apache people for a time. He was a member of the first recorded crossing of the Hastings Cutoff in 1850. Abbotts Lagoon in the Point Reyes National Seashore is named after him.

Abbott raised dairy cattle and established a narrow gauge railroad. He also established a hotel and served in the California Assembly.

The book received an initial print run of 10,000 copies on June 1, 1917. Abbott was 89 or 90 years old when it was published. It received mildly positive reception upon its release. The Brooklyn Daily Eagle described Abbott's writing as "charming" and The Boston Globe called it an "authentic record." A review by Frances Fort Brown in The Chattanooga News called Abbott's writing "young in spirit" and recommended it as a "valuable historical work."

Charles Kelly noted in the Utah Historical Quarterly that Abbott's memoir is the only existing account that discusses the journey through the Hastings Cutoff humorously and is the only account that mentions any thievery along the route. Robert Krick, in a retrospective on the Neale Publishing Company, described the book as "more entertaining than reliable."

References

External links 

 Recollections of a California Pioneer at the Internet Archive

1917 non-fiction books
Neale Publishing Company books
American memoirs